"Angel of Darkness" is the third single by German composer Alex Christensen featuring vocals from Yasmin Knoch, which was released in 2003 by Epic Records. The song was released as a tie in with the video game Tomb Raider: The Angel of Darkness and peaked at number 21 on the German singles chart.

Track listing

Music video
A music video was shot in 2003 and directed by Nikolaj Georgiew and features scenes from the Tomb Raider: Angel of Darkness videogame.

Charts

Release history

References 

2003 singles
2003 songs
Epic Records singles
Song recordings produced by Alex Christensen
Songs written by Alex Christensen